NGC 1334 is a spiral galaxy located about 185 million light-years away in the constellation Perseus. It was discovered by astronomer Heinrich d'Arrest on February 14, 1863. NGC 1334 is a member of the Perseus Cluster and is a starburst galaxy. It also appears to have a complex distorted structure.

See also
 List of NGC objects (1001–2000)
 NGC 6045

References

External links

Perseus Cluster
Perseus (constellation)
Spiral galaxies
1334
013001 
Astronomical objects discovered in 1863
02759
Peculiar galaxies
Starburst galaxies